The history of the Jews in Munich, Germany, dates back to the beginning of the 13th century. An early written reference to a Jewish presence in Munich is dated 1229, when Abraham de Munichen acted as a witness to the sale of a house in Ratisbon.

In 1210, Ludwig I, Duke of Bavaria, permitted the Jews to build a synagogue and to acquire a cemetery in 1225. The Jews’ street soon developed into a ghetto, beyond which the Jews were not permitted to live until 1440; the ghetto contained, besides the synagogue, a communal house, a ritual bath, a slaughter-house, and a hospital.

By the second half of the thirteenth century, the community had increased to 200. Bavarian Jews had loaned money to Otto I, Duke of Bavaria, around 1180 to build Landshuth, and received in return special privileges, which were confirmed by Ludwig I, who in 1230 granted them the right to elect the so-called “Jews’ judge.”

A pogrom after "a Christian child was found dead and many Jews were killed as revenge " in 1286 is commemorated by two memorial  dirges (Kinnot) printed in "Gezerot Ashkenaz Vetzarfat," Haberman, 1956 and described in "Das Martyrologium des Nurnberger Memorbuches" Salfield, 1898

However, in 1442 Jews were excluded from Upper Bavaria, including Munich.

Jews only settled back in Munich at the end of the 18th century (53 in 1781, 127 in 1790). The Jewish population is estimated at around 3,500-4,000 in 1875 and around 11,000 in 1910 after the immigration of Eastern Jews following the outbreak of pogroms in Russia. By 1910, 20% of Bavaria's Jews (approximately 11,000 people) lived in the Bavarian capital.

By the time the Nazis rose to national power in 1933, there were about 9,000-10,000 Jews in Munich. By May 1938, about 3,500 Jews had emigrated, ca. 3,100 of them moving abroad. By May 1939, the number of Jews in the city had further declined to 5,000. In 1944, only 7 Jews remained in Munich. During the war, about 3,000 Jews were deported, with only about 300 returning after the war.

A new community was founded in 1945, which had grown to about 3,500 by 1970. Following the emigration of Jews from the former Soviet Union after 1990, the Jewish population in Munich numbered 5,000 in 1995 and is estimated today to around 9,000, making it the second largest Jewish community in Germany after Berlin.

References

 Shoah Resource Center
 Jewish Life in Munich (in German)
 Chronology of Jews in Munich
 Encyclopedia Judaica
 Jews in Munich
 WWII persecution of Jews in Munich
 Jewish Munich
 German Jewry

External links
  Jewish Population by Cities
 The Jewish Community of Munich, The Museum of the Jewish People at Beit Hatfutsot
 Walther Weiss Collection at the Leo Baeck Institute, New York, contains materials on the Jewish community of Munich from 1894-1941

Further reading
 Stefan Schwarz: Die Juden in Bayern im Wandel der Zeiten, Olzog, München 1980, 

Munich
Jewish
Munich
Jewish
Munich

de:Geschichte der Juden in Deutschland
fr:Histoire des Juifs en Allemagne
he:יהדות גרמניה
nl:Geschiedenis van de Joden in Duitsland